Sireli Maqala (born 20 March 2000) is a Fijian rugby union player.

Maqala was selected in the Fijian squad for the 2021 Oceania Sevens Championship, a warm-up tournament prior to the 2020 Summer Olympics. In July 2021, he was named in the Fijian squad for the rugby seven tournament at the Olympics.

Maqala was part of the Fiji sevens team that won a silver medal at the 2022 Commonwealth Games.

References

External links

2000 births
Living people
Fijian rugby sevens players
Fiji international rugby sevens players
Male rugby sevens players
Olympic rugby sevens players of Fiji
Rugby sevens players at the 2020 Summer Olympics
Medalists at the 2020 Summer Olympics
Olympic gold medalists for Fiji
Olympic medalists in rugby sevens
Aviron Bayonnais players
Rugby sevens players at the 2022 Commonwealth Games
Commonwealth Games silver medallists for Fiji
Commonwealth Games medallists in rugby sevens
Medallists at the 2022 Commonwealth Games